Kendall A. Reyes (born September 26, 1989) is a former American football defensive end. In 2010, he served as one of four team captains for the University of Connecticut Huskies and was named to the All-Big East Conference first-team following the season. He was drafted by the San Diego Chargers in the second round of the 2012 NFL Draft, and also played for the Washington Redskins, Kansas City Chiefs, and New York Jets.

High school career
Kendall Reyes attended Nashua High School North in Nashua, New Hampshire from 2003–2007. In football, Reyes was a standout wide receiver, tight end, linebacker and defensive end. He was twice named All-State and also a two-time All-Conference pick. Following his senior year, he was selected to play at the Shriners' All-Star Game.

Reyes was also a three-sport athlete at Nashua North, also playing basketball and track & field during his high school career. As a sophomore in 2005, he placed eighth in the long jump with a leap of 6.18 meters (20 ft, 3.5 in) at the NHIAA Meet of Champions. At the 2006 NHIAA Class L Track Championships, he earned a third-place finish in the discus with a throw of 52.12 meters (171 ft), while also placing sixth in the high jump (1.83m or 6'0"). He posted a personal-best throw of 14.35 meters (47'1") in the shot put as a senior.

Reyes was not that heavily recruited out of high school, and he only received 3 offers from Division 1 schools (Connecticut, New Hampshire). On November 11, 2006, Reyes verbally committed to Connecticut.

Professional career

Reyes was selected in round 2, pick 49 by the San Diego Chargers in the 2012 NFL Draft. He was the highest drafted defensive lineman in school history.

San Diego Chargers
When the Chargers drafted him with the 49th overall pick in the 2012 NFL Draft, Reyes became Nashua High School North’s first NFL draft pick and the first player from Nashua to be drafted since the Cincinnati Bengals selected tackle Herb Webster in the fifth round of the 1988 NFL Draft. He was also the highest drafted defensive lineman in school history.

In his rookie season, Reyes led the Chargers’ defensive line with 19 quarterback pressures and 15 quarterback hits, and he finished the year third on the team with 5.5 sacks and nine tackles for loss. He recorded his first two NFL sacks against future Hall of Fame quarterback Peyton Manning and on December 23, during a road win against the New York Jets, racked up 3.5 sacks, the most by a Chargers rookie in 26 years. Reyes closed out his initial campaign by earning All-Rookie honors from ESPN.com.

In 2013, Reyes was named starter right next to Corey Liuget on the defensive line. Reyes went on to play all 16 games as a starter and managed to collect 34 tackles, 5 sacks, and 2 passes defended.

Washington Redskins
Reyes signed a one-year contract with the Washington Redskins on March 11, 2016. He was released by the Redskins on October 5, 2016.

Kansas City Chiefs
On October 18, 2016, Reyes was signed by the Kansas City Chiefs.

New York Jets
On August 3, 2018, Reyes signed with the New York Jets. He was released on August 31, 2018.

Coaching career
Reyes began his coaching career in January 2019 at the University of New Hampshire.

Personal life
Reyes still spends a lot of time in Nashua during the offseason. In March 2013, the Boys and Girls Club of Greater Nashua inducted him into its Hall of Fame. Reyes spent much of his time as a youth at the Club, where he sharpened his athletic and academic skills. Now he works with the Club to help develop initiatives for youths. A former class president at Nashua North High, Reyes also spends time at his alma mater talking to student-athletes about education and being good community citizens.

References

External links

 
  UConnHuskies.com

1989 births
Living people
American football defensive tackles
American football defensive ends
Players of American football from New Hampshire
Sportspeople from Nashua, New Hampshire
UConn Huskies football players
San Diego Chargers players
Washington Redskins players
Kansas City Chiefs players
New York Jets players